Robert Fraisse (born 12 April 1934) is a French fencer. He competed in the team sabre event at the 1964 Summer Olympics.

References

External links
 

1934 births
Living people
French male sabre fencers
Olympic fencers of France
Fencers at the 1964 Summer Olympics